Quinten Pounds (born December 31, 1996) is an American football wide receiver for the Reds de la Ciudad de México of the Liga de Fútbol Americano Profesional (LFA). He also played for the Cologne Centurions of the European League of Football. He played college football for the University of Washington.

Early life
Pounds was born in Cypress, California and went to Cypress High School, where he participated in basketball and in track and field as a high jumper, in addition to football. As a senior in 2014, he lead the Centurions to an 8–3 record as the team's leading receiver (29 catches for 570 yards and eight touchdowns) and leading rusher (788 yards and 11 touchdowns), earning Empire League MVP and first-team All-County honors.

College career
On October 29, 2014, Pounds committed to the University of Washington and the Washington Huskies football program. In five seasons he suffered three season ending injuries in 2015, 2017 and 2018. Because of that, he redshirted his 2016 freshman and 2017 sophomore year.

College statistics

Professional career

Cologne Centurions
Pounds signed with the Cologne Centurions for the 2021 season as one of their four American imports. He recorded 666 receiving yards and eight touchdowns. On October 1, 2021, the franchise announced his contract extension for 2022. In his second season with the team, Pounds made 86 receptions for 1,009 yards and 13 touchdowns. He was named the team MVP.

Professional statistics

References

External links
Washington Huskies bio
ELF bio

1996 births
Living people
American football wide receivers
Players of American football from California
Cologne Centurions (ELF) players
American expatriate players of American football
Washington Huskies football players
People from Cypress, California